The following lists events that happened during the year 2003 in Bosnia and Herzegovina.

Incumbents
Presidency:
Sulejman Tihić 
Dragan Čović 
Mirko Šarović (until April 2), Borislav Paravac (starting April 2)
Prime Minister: Adnan Terzić

Deaths

October
19 October – Alija Izetbegović, politician, member and chairman of the Presidency (b. 1925).

References

 
Years of the 21st century in Bosnia and Herzegovina
2000s in Bosnia and Herzegovina
Bosnia and Herzegovina
Bosnia and Herzegovina